Tomas Oppus, officially the Municipality of Tomas Oppus, is a 5th class municipality in the province of Southern Leyte, Philippines. According to the 2020 census, it has a population of 16,990 people.

Geography

Barangays
Tomas Oppus is politically subdivided into 29 barangays.

Climate

Demographics

Economy

References

External links
 Tomas Oppus Profile at PhilAtlas.com
 [ Philippine Standard Geographic Code]
Philippine Census Information
Local Governance Performance Management System

Municipalities of Southern Leyte